The Bektashi Order (see Bektashi Order) is an Islamic Sufi order that spread to Albania through Albanian Janissaries during the period of Ottoman control in Albania. The Bektashi make up 20% of Albania's Muslim population and 2.5% of the country's population. In Albania, the Bektashi Order has taken on a patriotic and nationalistic character, and it has played a major role in the Albanian National Awakening. Bektashi leaders have historically been prominent members in Albanian movements for self-determination and national autonomy, which has contributed to its popularity amongst the Albanians, and for most of Albania's Bektashi community, their affiliation with the order is based on cultural heritage rather than actual religious belief. In regards to ethics, the Bektashi adhere to the line - Be master of your hands, your tongue, and your loins - which essentially means do not steal, do not lie or speak idly, and do not commit adultery.

History

Ottoman period

The Bektashi Order was mainly spread in Albania through the Janissaries - members of a high-ranking military social class in the Ottoman Empire consisting of Balkan children who were raised by the Ottomans as part of the Devshirme system - in the 16th century, and is first associated with the figure, Sari Saltik (Sari Salltëk in Albanian). Many of the janissaries were indeed Albanians. Legend holds that the tekke (teqe in Albanian) of Sersem Ali Baba in Tetova of today's North Macedonia was founded in the mid 16th century, which would make it the oldest teqe in Albanian-speaking territory. Bektashism spread to Albania slowly, especially considering the language barriers Persian and Turkish missionaries faced; Bektashi missionaries were sent to Albania from the Bektashi centre at Dimetoka, usually in groups of three. The first missionaries arrived during the 14th and 15th centuries.

During Evliya Çelebi's travels in the southern Balkans in the second half of the 17th century, the presence of Bektashi teqes in Mitrovica and Kaçanik in Kosovo during 1660 was noted. Additionally, during Çelebi's tour of southern Albania in the summer of 1670, he also noted the presence of Bektashi teqes in Kaninë and Vlora. The construction of the Teqeja e Zallit (gravel teqe) in 1780 under Asim Baba laid the foundations for the growth of the Bektashi Order within Albania, and it was followed by the construction of more teqes throughout Albania - especially during the period between 1790 and 1825, in which the Bektashi Order maintained a strong presence within Albanian-speaking territories. The expansion of Bektashism in south Albania is linked to the rule of Ali Pasha of Ioannina, who was affiliated with the order and promoted its expansion. Ali Pasha used Bektashi dervishes as spies and diplomatic agents; this led to Mustafa Pasha Bushatli of the Bushati family (who was ruler of the Pashalik of Scutari) refusing to admit Bektashi dervishes to his provinces out of concern that they were spies for Ali.He drove the Bektashi Order out of north Albania for this very reason.

The Auspicious Event of 1826, which culminated in the destruction of the Janissary Corps by the Ottoman ruler Sultan Mahmud II, also affected the Bektashi Order due to their strong affiliation with the janissaries. As in Anatolia, many Bektashi buildings in Albania destroyed or burnt down, including the teqes. However, the Bektashi Order in Albania had recovered fully by the second half of the 19th century. This would also be when Bektashism in Albania adopted Albanian nationalism as a major part of its doctrine, and when the religion would see increased popularity amongst Albanians. Bektashis contributed greatly to Albanian patriotic efforts during this time and were crucial in educating the mostly illiterate Albanian population in the Albanian language. Albanians were attracted to Bektashism for certain values - more particularly, its traditional tolerance and regard for other religions, and its tolerance and open-mindedness towards other practices and beliefs. Additionally, in contrast to Sunni Islam, which was more favourable of the Ottomans and promoted Arabic script, Bektashism was more sympathetic for local concerns and favoured the use of a Latin script for the Albanian language. At the beginning of the 20th century, about 15% of Albania's population was Bektashi, and Bektashi teqes served as underground Albanian-language schools and Albanian-language book distributors. However, contrary to what many Bektashi intellectuals had hoped for, the sect did not become the Albanian national religion, especially due to the fact that the Order was disproportionately concentrated in the south of Albania. Around 70% of all Bektashi teqes were found south of Berat and only about 3% in the north.

Post-independence

After the Albanian declaration of independence in 1912, the political instability that followed was harmful to the Albanian Bektashis. The teqes of Albania suffered significant damage and destruction throughout the Balkan Wars and the first two years of World War I. A period of destruction came with the Muslim Uprising of Albania, a Sunni Muslim revolt that was popular in central Albania and demanded that control of Albania was returned to the Ottomans, that the Albanian flag was replaced by the Ottoman one, and the use of Ottoman Turkish as the national language (or at least using Arabic script for Albanian) amongst several other demands. The rebels, led by the fanatic Haxhi Qamili, burnt down many Bektashi teqes from Martanesh in Bulqizë to as far south as Berat due to the strong links between Bektashism and Albanian nationalism (including the efforts Albanian Bektashis made towards the progression of Albanian education and Albanian independence) as well as the religious differences between the Shi'ite-oriented Bektashis and the Sunni Muslim rebels.

During the conflict between Albanians and Greeks in southern Albania during 1914–1915, where Greek forces took advantage of the political instability of Albania and attempted to annex as much Albanian territory into Greece as possible or succeed in creating the Autonomous Republic of Northern Epirus, at least 145 Albanian villages in southern Albania were looted and destroyed. Accompanying this was the destruction of 48 teqes at the hands of the Greek forces. In total, 80 per cent of the teqes in Albania were either extremely damaged or destroyed entirely during 1914–1915. The Bektashi Order of Albania has not fully recovered since this loss. With the conclusion of the First World War, stability returned to the surviving Albanian Bektashi community, and many teqes were rebuilt in the early 1920s.

By 1920, the Bektashi community in Albania had gained enough recognition to have one a representative - Aqif Pasha Biçaku - on the High Regency Council which governed Albania during the absence of Prince Wied; this council consisted of 4 representatives for each religious community. The Bektashi community of Albania stressed its separation from the Turkish Bektashi community during the First National Congress of the Bektashi (held at the teqe of Prishta in Skrapar and headed by Baba Ahmet Turani), where they stressed that they were the first religious community of Albania to be free of foreign control. At a 1923 Muslim conference held in Tirana, disputes arose between the Bektashis and the Sunnis, ultimately culminating in the Bektashi representatives leaving the meeting and breaking relations with the Grand Mufti in Istanbul.

The Second National Congress of the Bektashi was held on 8–9 July 1924, in Gjirokastër under Baba Ahmet Turani. The Turkish Bektashi community contemplated relocating their headquarters in Albania due to the political climate of Turkey, and thereby resolved that religious ceremonies could be performed in the Albanian language; all the dervish orders in Turkey were banned in 1925 by Mustafa Kemal Atatürk. The Third National Congress of the Bektashi was held in the teqe of Turan near Korça on 23 September 1929, this time under Baba Zylfo of Melçan, and it turned out to be the most crucial early Bektashi congress. The order declared itself to be a religious community of its own - autonomous from mainstream Islam - and they initiated the Kryegjysh system, with their Kryegjyshata in Tirana as their headquarters. Until 1937, the Kryegjysh appointment was approved by King Zog.

As a result of the Turkish ban on dervish orders and the closing of all the teqes there, the Albanian bektashis invited the Kryegjysh of Turkey, Salih Nijazi Dede (also an Albanian from the Kolonja region) to return to Albania, which he carried out in 1930 and re-established the Bektashi headquarters in Tirana in 1931. Estimations on the number of teqes in Albania at the time range from 43 to 65 in 1928 and 52 in 1933, whilst there were about a dozen teqes in Kosovo and several in the Albanian-speaking regions of North Macedonia.

Communist period
After World War II, the Albanian Partisans seized control of the nation and established a Stalinist regime. The Fourth National Congress of the Bektashi was held in Tirana on the 5th of May, 1945, leading to a change of leadership. Xhafer Sadik was made Kryegjysh, and Baba Faja Martaneshi (a Communist collaborator) was made secretary general, but the death of Sadiku on 2 August 1945 led to an early replacement by Abaz Hilmi. On 19 March 1947, Abaz Hilmi Dede shot and killed both Baba Faja Martaneshi and Baba Fejzo Dervishi prior to committing suicide after a heated argument over religious matters occurred. The communist dictatorship established complete control over the Bektashi Order through purges and by frightening the babas into submission or silence; this was soon followed with the death of many of the Bektashi leaders, such as Baba Qamil Gllava of Tepelena (executed in Gjirokastra, 1946), Baba Ali Myrteza of Kruja (tortured and then thrown out of a prison window), Baba Ali Tomorri and Baba Shefket Koshtani of Tepelena (executed). Ahmet Myftar assumed the Kryegjyshata on 8 June 1947, and had no option but to be a puppet of the Communist regime.

The Fifth National Congress of the Bektashi was held in Tirana on the 16th of April, 1950, and in 1954, there were still between 43 and 68 teqes in the country. In 1967, the new Albanian Constitution banned religion, which resulted in a militant political campaign against religious institutions and groups; young people were encouraged to attack mosques, teqes and churches, and to denounce members of the clergy to communist authorities, resulting in the disbandment of the Bektashi community. Most teqes and tyrbes - along with churches and mosques - were razed to the ground, and their leaders were sent into internal exile or imprisoned. Of the 53 Bektashi teqes that existed prior to this, only 6 remained. The Bektashi community in Albania was eradicated, but two teqes continued to function outside of Albania - one in Gjakova, Kosovo, under Baba Qazim Bakalli, and one in Taylor, Detroit in Michigan, United States, founded by Baba Rexheb in 1954. The teqe of Gjakova was later burnt down by Serbian forces in 1999 along with the rest of the old town of Gjakova during the Kosovo War. In 1993, after the fall of Communism in Albania, one dervish and 5 babas were all that remained in the country, with only 6 remaining teqes.

Present
A provisional committee for the revival of the Bektashi Order was founded in Tirana on 27 January 1991. The new community, under Baba Reshat Bardhi, has since worked to revive the Order, and the Kryegjyshata of Tirana was reopened on the 22nd of March, 1991, during Novruz. This reopening was attended by other religious figures in Albania, such as Mother Teresa, and a Sixth National Congress of the Bektashi occurred on 19–20 July 1993. A Seventh National Congress of the Bektashi occurred on the 23–24 September 2000, and an Eight on 21 September 2005. A Ninth congress was held on the 6th of July, 2009. Rebuilding was difficult for the Bektashi, who lacked a foreign patron to provide funding for their revival, with the exception of modest donations from the American-Albanian Bektashi community. However, the Bektashi Order managed to legally have much of their extensive previous property returned, and through methods such as leasing out their pasturelands, the Bektashi community lives in good part.

Bektashism and Albanian nationalism
During the 19th and 20th centuries, Albanian Bektashism incorporated Albanian nationalism as a central element of its doctrine. After the Auspicious Event and the persecution of the Bektashi Order throughout the Ottoman Empire, Bektashism emerged in Albania with nationalism and anti-Ottoman sentiment - the order's historical conflict with the Ottoman authorities contributed to their nationalist, anti-Turk stance, which went hand-in-hand with the liberation heterodoxy that predominated in Albanian Bektashi philosophy. It is this same heterodoxy and ability to assimilate external influences that enabled the order to fully integrate Albanian nationalist doctrine within its system, which made it extremely popular in Albania.

Nationalist sentiment amongst Albanian Bektashis began to blossom within the second half of the 19th century - Bektashi clergy, stemming from both peasantry and wealthier social classes, were very active in Albanian national movements. They would spread nationalist ideas and hold national and local meetings for like-minded patriotic groups and individuals within their teqes. The influence of the Bektashi in this regard also extended to the local Albanian Orthodox population. In particular, the Bektashi clergy were crucial to the teaching of the Albanian language and the distribution of Albanian books and made enormous progress in this aspect. Bektashi teqes became a network of underground Albanian-language schools that would distribute books, spellers and newspapers to the local Albanian population during a time where education in the Albanian language was discouraged/minimised or outright banned by the Ottoman authorities. Teqes outside of Albania, such as the teqe in Cairo, supported these efforts by sending Albanian dervishes to distribute Albanian books throughout Albanian-inhabited territories. The Atë's, or Babas, were significant contributors to the Albanian National Awakening, culminating in some of them being imprisoned or worse for their efforts. Although they were part of the Muslim community and had contributed to the advancement of Albanian literature in Arabic script, the Albanian Bektashis supported and promoted the use of the Latin script for the Albanian alphabet. Efforts by the Young Turks to send imams and dervishes to promote the use of the Arabic script by winning over the Bektashi clergy were thwarted and ignored. The Bektashi clergy created and operated several 'clubs' and patriotic societies in 20th century Albania, and their primary goal was to promote teaching in the Albanian language and to distribute Albanian literature. In southern Albania, the Bektashi strongly supported armed çeta groups and their anti-Ottoman activities; the Bektashi teqes were usually in isolated areas out of the reach of Turkish authorities, hence they could support these groups and practically act as the headquarters of Albanian nationalist movements. Teqes would also be the point of communication between çetas and the supporting civilian population. Many instances exist where an Atë and his teqe have furthered the Albanian national cause by spreading awareness about it, educating Albanian populations or supporting and harbouring çeta groups.

Leadership

The Bektashi Order is headed by a Kryegjysh (otherwise known as dedebaba elsewhere). The current Kryegjysh is Baba Mondi. In Albania, the World Headquarters of the Bektashi divides the country into 6 different administrative districts (similar to Christian parishes and patriarchates), each of which is called a gjyshata.

 The Gjyshata of Gjirokastra (headquarters: tekke of Asim Bab): the regions of Gjirokastra, Saranda and Tepelena.
 The Gjyshata of Korça (headquarters: tekke of Turan): the regions of Korça, Devoll, Pogradec and Kolonja, including Leskovik.
 The Gjyshata of Kruja (headquarters: tekke of Fushë Kruj): the regions of Kruja, Kurbin, Bulqiza, Dibra, Mat, Shkodra and Durrës.
 The Gjyshata of Elbasan (headquarters: tekke of Baba Xhefai): the regions of Elbasan, Gramsh, Peqin, Lushnja, Kavaja, and Librazhd, including Përrenjas.
 The Gjyshata of Vlora (headquarters: tekke of Kusum Bab): the regions of Vlora, Mallakastra, Fier, including Patos and Roskovec.
 The Gjyshata of Berat (headquarters: tekke of Prisht): the regions of Berat, Skrapar and Përmet.

The Albanian Bektashi Order in Kosovo is centred around Gjakova and is currently under the leadership of Baba Mumin Lama. They recognise the Albanian leadership in Tirana as the heads of their order.

List of Kryegjysha (Dedebabas)
 Salih Nijazi (from 1930 to 1941)
 Ali Riza Dede (from 1942 to 1944)
 Kamber Ali (from 1944 to 1945)
 Xhafer Sadik (from 1945 to 1945)
 Abaz Hilmi (from 1945 to 1947)
 Ahmet Myftar (from 1947 to 1958)
 Baba Reshat (from 1991 to 2011)
 Baba Mondi (from 2011–present)

Structure
The Bektashi Order in Albania has a hierarchal structure:
 The ashik (from Turkish aşık, literally 'lover') is a Bektashi follower who has not yet been initiated.
 The muhib (meaning 'one who loves, sympathiser') is an initiate of the Bektashi community - one who has been initiated through a ritual purification or profession of faith during a ceremony at a teqe. 
 The varfa (from Albanian i varfur, meaning 'poor'), or poor dervishes, are the Bektashi equivalent of Christian monks. An initiate may become a varfa after a trial period of 1001 days and receives a white headdress called the taxh, usually living permanently at a teqe. Varfa cannot be removed from their oath as a poor dervish. Varfa must be wise, gentle, modest, submissive and a servant of mankind. Should someone curse or strike the varfa, the varfa must not react. If a varfa was married prior to becoming a poor dervish, they may stay at home with their family. Every varfa has a job or carries out a service of his own.
 Varfa can also vow to never marry, in which case they become a Myxher (from Turkish mücerred, meaning 'person tried by experience, pure, unmarried'), or celibate dervishes. Myxher wear a ring in their right ear.
 The Atë (literally meaning 'father' in Albanian) - or baba - is a spiritual leader, the equivalent of a sheikh in other Dervish orders. Each teqe is normally headed by an Atë. The Atë is the chief of the dervishes, and is also known as the udhërrëfenjës (meaning 'guide' in Albanian).
 The Gjysh (literally meaning 'grandfather' in Albanian), is the superior of the babas - when there are several Atë's, they choose one among them to serve as the Gjysh. The Gjysh has passed through the final ceremony, and is responsible for the teqe's of a certain region. For a poor dervish to become an Atë, he must be initiated by the Gjysh.
 The Kryegjysh, or Stërgjysh (literally meaning 'Head-Grandfather' and 'Great-Grandfather' respectively), known in Turkish as dede baba, is the leader of the Bektashi Order and is chosen amongst the Gjyshes by the Gjyshes themselves.

List of Teqes and Shrines

District of Bulqiza

 Teqe of Bulqiza, Bulqizë
 Teqe of Balim Sultan, Martanesh
 Teqe of Haxhi Hysen Baba, Martanesh
 Tyrbe of Baba Hysen, Zërqan

District of Berat

 Teqe of Baba Iljaz, Osmënzeza
 Teqe of Baba Muharrem, Plashnik
 Teqe of Kulmak (or Teqe of Mount Tomorr or Tyrbe of Abbas Ali), Mount Tomorr
 Teqe of Baba Kamber, Velabisht
 Teqe of Baba Tahir, Vokopola

District of Delvina

 Dervishia of Beqir Efendi, Delvinë

District of Devoll

 Teqe of Baba Kasem, Kuç

District of Dibra

 Teqe of Bllaca, Bllaca

District of Elbasan

 Teqe of Ibrahim Xhefai Baba (or Teqe of Fakri Mustafai Baba or Teqe of Krasta), Elbasan
 Teqe of Baba Ali Horasani (or Teqe of Baba Xhemali), Elbasan
 Teqe of Baba Hamit (or Teqe of Baba Ali Riza), Elbasan

District of Fier

 Teqe of Cakran, Cakran
 Teqe of Baba Ali Horasani, Mbyet

District of Gjirokastra

 Teqe of Asim Baba, Gjirokastër
 Hajdërije Teqe (or Teqe of Shtuf or Teqe of Baba Sulejman), Gjirokastër
 Teqe of Baba Zejnel (or Teqe of Zejnel Abedin Baba), Gjirokastër
 Teqe of Baba Ali (or Teqe of Melan), Melan
 Dervishia of Baba Hasan, Picar

District of Gramsh

 Teqe of Baba Ahmet, Dushk
 Teqe of Baba Mustafa, Shëmbërdhenj

District of Kavaja

 Teqe of Baba Sako, Luz i Madh

District of Kolonja

 Teqe of Baba Hasan (or Teqe of Baba Selim), Kreshova
 Teqe of Haxhi Baba Horasani, Qesaraka
 Teqe of Baba Sulejman, Sanjollas
 Teqe of Baba Husejn (or Baruç Teqe), Starja

District of Korça

 Teqe of Mazreka, Mazreka
 Teqe of Baba Hysen (or Teqe of Baba Abdullah Melçani), Melçan
 Tyrbe of Plasa, Plasa
 Teqe of Baba Ismail, Polena
 Tyrbe of Pulaha, Pulaha
 Teqe of Beqir Efendi, Qatrom
 Teqe of Baba Salih Elbasani, Turan
 Teqe of Vloçisht, Vloçisht
 Teqe of Vrëpska, Vrëpska

District of Kruja

 Teqe of Shemimi Baba, Fushë Kruja
 Teqe of Baba Hamza (or Teqe of Haxhi Hamza), Krujë
 Teqe of Haxhi Jahja Baba, Krujë
 Tyrbe of Mustafa Dollma, Krujë
 Tyrbe of Zemzi Baba, Krujë
 Tyrbe of Sari Saltik, Mount Kruja

District of Kurbin

 Teqe of Hajdar Baba, Gjonëm
 Teqe of Baba Isak, Shullaz

District of Lushnja

 Tyrbe of Baba Skënder, Lushnja

District of Mallakastra

 Dervishia of Aranitas, Aranitas
 Dervishia of Çorrush, Çorrush
 Teqe of Baba Xhelal, Drizar
 Dervishia of Fratar, Fratar
 Teqe of Baba Husejn, Greshica
 Teqe of Hekal, Hekal
 Teqe of Baba Ismail, Kapaj
 Teqe of Baba Hasan, Kremenar
 Teqe of Baba Rifat, Kuta
 Teqe of Ngrançija (or Teqe of Nuri Baba), Ngrançija

District of Përmet

 Teqe of Baba Ali, Alipostivan
 Teqe of Baba Jemin (or Teqe of Baba Dalip), Bubës i Parë
 Teqe of Bubës (or Teqe of Baba Ali), Bubës i Sipërm
 Teqe of Baba Tahir Nasibi, Frashër
 Teqe of Baba Husejn, Gumen
 Teqe of Hasan Dede, Këlcyra
 Dervishia of Kosina, Kosina
 Teqe of Kostrec, Kostrec
 Teqe of Baba Abedin, Leskovik
 Teqe of Pacomit, Pacomit
 Teqe of Baba Bektash (or Teqe of Baba Xhafer), Përmet
 Teqe of Baba Ali, Përmet
 Teqe of Petran, Petran
 Teqe of Podgoran, Podgoran
 Tyrbe of Rodenj, Rodenj
 Teqe of Baba Tahir (Përmet) (or Teqe of Suka), Suka
 Tyrbe of Zhepova, Zhepova

District of Saranda

 Teqe of Baba Xhafer, Borsh
 Teqe of Dede Reshat Bardhi, Saranda

District of Shkodra

 Tyrbe of Baba Kamber, Drisht

District of Skrapar

 Teqe of Baba Fetah, Backa
 Teqe of Baba Xhafer, Brerima
 Teqe of Çerrica, Çerrica
 Teqe of Kuç, Kuç
 Teqe of Lavdar, Lavdar
 Teqe of Baba Tahir, Prishta
 Teqe of Baba Meleq, Straficka
 Teqe of Baba Behlul, Therepel

District of Tepelena

 Dervishia of Bënça, Bënça
 Teqe of Dukaj, Dukaj
 Teqe of Ismail Baba, Gllava
 Teqe of Baba Kamber, Kiçok
 Teqe of Baba Islam, Komar
 Teqe of Baba Sadik, Koshtan
 Teqe of Baba Husejn (or Teqe of Harakop), Krahës
 Teqe of Baba Musa, Maricaj
 Teqe of Baba Salih, Matohasanaj
 Teqe of Memaliaj (or Tyrbe of Baba Hasan), Memaliaj
 Teqe of Progonat, Progonat
 Tyrbe of Qesarat, Qesarat
 Teqe of Baba Selman, Rabija
 Dervishia of Rozeç, Rozeç
 Teqe of Demir Han, Tepelena
 Teqe of Baba Ali (or Teqe of Turan), Turan
 Teqe of Baba Ali (or Teqe of Veliqot), Veliqot

District of Tirana

 Kryegjyshata, Tirana

District of Vlora

 Teqe of Gjorm, Gjorm
 Teqe of Haxhi Baba Mehmet Aliu, Golimbas
 Teqe of Gorisht, Gorisht
 Teqe of Sinan Pasha (or Teqe of Kanina), Kaninë
 Teqe of Shkoza, Shkoza
 Teqe of Smokthina, Smokthina
 Teqe of Kusum Baba (or Mekam of Kusum Baba), Vlorë

Kosovo

 Teqe of Shemseddin Baba, Gjakova
 Teqe of Baba Adem, Prizren

North Macedonia

 Teqe of Hidër Baba, Kërçova
 Teqe of Harabati Baba, Tetova

Greece

 Teqe of Durballi Sultan, Farsala
 Teqe of Ali Dede Horasani (or Teqe of Candia or Teqe of Rrisk Baba), Heraklion 
 Teqe of Abdullah Baba, Katerini
 Teqe of Hysejn Baba, Konica

America

 First Albanian Bektashi Tekke in America, Taylor, Michigan

Notable Figures
 Ali Pasha of Ioannina, Albanian ruler of the Pashalik of Janina
 Baba Shemin, Albanian Bektashi martyr and bejtexhi
 Nasibi Tahir Babai, Albanian Bektashi wali and bejtexhi
 Naim Frashëri, Albanian poet, writer and activist involved in the Albanian National Awakening
 Abdyl Frashëri, Albanian statesman, diplomat and activist involved in the Albanian National Awakening
 Sami Frashëri, Albanian literary figure and activist involved in the Albanian National Awakening
 Baba Faja Martaneshi, Albanian Bektashi baba and resistance leader
 Ali Tomorri, Albanian Bektashi religious leader

References

Sources 

 
Shia Islam in Albania
Sufism in Albania
Ottoman Albania
Sufi orders
Bektashi Order